T. A. Chapman Co., commonly known as Chapman's was a department store based in Milwaukee, Wisconsin.  The chain was founded by Timothy Appleton Chapman in 1857.  He opened the chain's flagship store on Wisconsin Avenue in downtown Milwaukee in 1872.  The original Wisconsin Avenue location was destroyed by fire 1884, and rebuilt.  In 1978, the company acquired Manchester's Department Stores in Madison, Wisconsin.  The Chapman family retained ownership of the company until 1983, and eventually it had seven locations.  The company filed for Chapter 11 Bankruptcy in 1987.  At the time of bankruptcy, there were six locations: three in Milwaukee, two in Madison and one in Appleton.

References

Defunct department stores based in Wisconsin
Defunct companies based in Wisconsin
Companies based in Milwaukee
American companies established in 1857
Retail companies established in 1857
Retail companies disestablished in 1987
1857 establishments in Wisconsin
1983 disestablishments in Wisconsin